Jelena Blagojević (born 1 December 1988) is a Serbian professional volleyball player. She plays for Serbia women's national volleyball team. She competed in the 2012 Summer Olympics. She plays for KS DevelopRes Rzeszów.

Achievements

Clubs
 Serbian volleyball league: 2009/10, 2010/11
 Serbian Volleyball Cup: 2009/10, 2010/11
 Polish Volleyball League: 2016/17
MVP CEV Women's Challenge Cup: 2015/16
  Best Outside hitter, Polish cup : 2019/2020
 Polish Supercup: 2022/23
MVP Polish Supercup: 2022/23

References

1988 births
Living people
People from Olovo
Serbs of Bosnia and Herzegovina
Serbian women's volleyball players
Olympic volleyball players of Serbia
Volleyball players at the 2012 Summer Olympics
Expatriate volleyball players in Italy
Serbian expatriate sportspeople in Italy
Expatriate volleyball players in Turkey
Serbian expatriate sportspeople in Turkey
Expatriate volleyball players in Poland
Serbian expatriate sportspeople in Poland
European champions for Serbia
Volleyball players at the 2020 Summer Olympics
Medalists at the 2020 Summer Olympics
Olympic medalists in volleyball
Olympic bronze medalists for Serbia